Iceland competed at the 1988 Summer Paralympics in Seoul, South Korea. 14 competitors from Iceland won 11 medals including 2 gold, 2 silver and 7 bronze and finished 31st in the medal table.

Medalists

See also 
 Iceland at the Paralympics
 Iceland at the 1988 Summer Olympics

References 

Nations at the 1988 Summer Paralympics
1988
1988 in Icelandic sport